As of January 2019, there were 139 registered cultural heritage monuments in Székesfehérvár, and three were being evaluated for the status.

List of cultural heritage monuments 
 under evaluation for official status

Notes
  As given in source, Kálmáncsehi; but also occurs written as ′Kálmáncsehy′ in other sources.
  The same building is listed with two different registry numbers in the source database.

References

Sources

External links

Heritage registers
Székesfehérvár
Tourist attractions in Fejér County